"Volando" (English: "Flying") is a song by Puerto Rican singer Mora from his debut studio album Primer Día de Clases (2022) and it was released on February 5, 2021, through Rimas Entertainment. A remix version of "Volando" featuring Puerto Rican rapper Bad Bunny and Panamanian singer Sech was made available worldwide on July 8, 2021 as a standalone single. Gabriel Mora Quintero wrote both the original version and its remix version with contributions from both Benito Martínez and Carlos Williams for the latter version. The production of the two versions were handled by a Colombian producer Sky.

Critical reception
According to Billboard, the team of El Conejo noted Mora’s prowess at writing sweet lyrics and his keen eye for singable reggaeton vocals a few years ago. The remix of “Volando” is an appetizer of this blend — and Mora is not shy even among two of the most current Latin music heavyweight holders: Bad Bunny, with his wholehearted lines, and Sech, who brings an R&B soulfulness to the track. Producer Sky Rompiendo also does a great job grasping the emo and pop-punk comeback, creating the infusion of warm guitar riffs into the beat.

Commercial performance
The remix version of "Volando" was a commercial success as it charted at number 3 in Spain and stayed there for 45 weeks. Also, it charted at number 89, 7, 29, 19, 14, 14, and 20 on the Billboard Hot 100, Hot Latin Songs, Argentina Hot 100, Bolivia, Colombia, Ecuador and Peru, respectively.

Music video
The music video for remix of "Volando" was released on July 9, 2021 on Mora's YouTube channel.

Charts

Weekly charts

Year-end charts

Certifications

Release history

References

External links
 

2021 singles
2021 songs
Bad Bunny songs